Maria Francesia Anna Venuti  (born 7 March 1941) is an Australian actress, entertainer and author, who has appeared in numerous stage, television shows and film productions,  over 50 years.

 
Venuti is a singer, as well as an accomplished pianist who is noted for her work in cabaret and supper clubs, including working throughout Asia.

Biography
Venuti's father was from Sicily, and came to Australia in 1926 and her mother, Bella who was 18 years younger than her father, was from Cairo, Egypt and came to Sydney in 1939. She has a daughter named Bianca by her previous husband, Tony; they are now divorced. She has a  half sister, Gina and had a half brother Francesco, who died of Diphtheria. Venuti has written a memoir, called A Whole Lot of Front.

Her early life was unsettled and when she was in kindergarten, she moved schools four times because of bullying due to her descent.

Stalking and intruder incident
In November 2016, Venuti was hospitalized after suffering a stroke, and was subsequently placed in a coma after the stress of an intruder entering her home in Gladesville, New South Wales. The police had been called three times previously, after the 38-year-old man was seen lingering outside her home and stalking Venuti, turning up with flowers and alleging he was married to her. The man was taken under escort to the Royal North Shore Hospital, for a mental evaluation.

Filmography

Film

Television

Theatre and cabaret 
Source:AusStage

Bibliography
Whole Load of Front (2011)

Awards

Mo Awards
The Australian Entertainment Mo Awards (commonly known informally as the Mo Awards), were annual Australian entertainment industry awards. They recognise achievements in live entertainment in Australia from 1975 to 2016.
 (wins only)
|-
| 2000
| Maria Venuti
| JohnCampbell Fellowship Award
| 
|-

References

External links
 

1941 births
Living people
Australian people of Egyptian descent
Australian people of Italian descent
Australian television actresses
Australian film actresses
Australian women singers
Members of the Order of Australia